The Sultanate of Nejd was the third iteration of the Third Saudi State, from 1921 to 1926. It was a monarchy led by the House of Saud, and a legal predecessor of modern-day Saudi Arabia. This version of the Third Saudi State was created when Abdul Aziz ibn Saud, Emir of Riyadh, declared himself sultan over Nejd and its dependencies. In December 1925, the Kingdom of Hejaz surrendered to the forces of Abdul Aziz ibn Saud, who was thereafter proclaimed king of Hejaz in January 1926 and merged his dominions into the Kingdom of Hejaz and Nejd.

References

External links

1920s in Saudi Arabia
1921 establishments in Asia
1926 disestablishments in Asia
Former Arab states
Nejd
Former countries of the interwar period
History of Nejd
History of Saudi Arabia
States and territories established in 1921
States and territories disestablished in 1926
Former sultanates